Maidan-E-Jung is a 1995 Indian Hindi-language action drama film directed by K.C. Bokadia. It features an ensemble cast of Manoj Kumar, Dharmendra, Jaya Prada, Mukesh Khanna, Akshay Kumar and Karisma Kapoor in the lead roles, with Amrish Puri and Gulshan Grover featuring as the villains. Also Kader Khan and Shakti Kapoor appear as comic reliefs in the film. 

Maidan-E-Jung released worldwide on 14th April 1995 and received mostly negative reviews from critics, with some praise towards Puri and Dharmendra's performances. It was an average grosser at the box office.

Plot
Thakur Ranvir Singh aka Daata Guru is a wealthy, powerful and influential head of a village. He owns and controls all the villagers and their properties. Anyone who dares to raise their voice against him is crushed by his employee, Shankar and his son Guman.

Karan is the youngest son of Daata Guru, who comes back to the village after completing his education and falls in love with Shankar's sister Tulsi. Meanwhile, Shankar saves Daata Guru's widowed daughter-in-law Lakshmi from Guman, who tries to rape her. When Daata Guru learns that Shankar has abducted Lakshmi and has married her, he is enraged and wants Shankar dead. Daata Guru also instigates Karan against Shankar, and threatens to cut off the villagers' water supply if they do not turn in Shankar to him.

Karan discovers the entire truth from Bhua ji and he decides to help Shankar against Daata Guru.

Cast
 Dharmendra as Shankar
 Akshay Kumar as Karan Singh  
 Karishma Kapoor as Tulsi
 Jaya Prada as Lakshmi
 Amrish Puri as Thakur Ranvir Singh aka Daata Guru, Karan's father 
 Gulshan Grover as Guman Singh
 Manoj Kumar as Master Dinanath
 Mukesh Khanna as Police DCP Arun
 Dina Pathak as Bhua ji
 Vaishnavi Mahant as Masterji's sister
 Kader Khan as Maganlal
 Shakti Kapoor as Banarsi

Soundtrack

References

External links 
 

1995 films
1990s Hindi-language films
Films scored by Bappi Lahiri
Films directed by K. C. Bokadia